The 1st Daytime Emmy Awards were held on Tuesday, May 28, 1974, to commemorate excellence in daytime programming from the previous year (1973). It was hosted by Barbara Walters and Peter Marshall at the Rockefeller Plaza in New York City and televised on NBC. They were introduced to the stage by game and variety show host Garry Moore. Broadcast from 12-1:30 p.m. EST, the telecast preempted Jackpot, Celebrity Sweepstakes and local programming. For the first and only time, the Daytime Emmy Awards aired on the same day as the Primetime Emmy Awards, broadcast that evening on NBC.

Winners in each category are in bold.

Outstanding Drama Series

Days of Our Lives
The Doctors
General Hospital

Outstanding Actor in a Daytime Drama Series

Macdonald Carey (Dr. Tom Horton, Days of our Lives)
John Beradino (Dr. Steve Hardy, General Hospital)
Peter Hansen (Lee Baldwin, General Hospital)

Outstanding Actress in a Daytime Drama Series

Mary Fickett (Ruth Martin, All My Children)
Elizabeth Hubbard (Dr. Althea Davis, The Doctors)
Rachel Ames (Audrey Hardy, General Hospital)
Mary Stuart (Joanne Gardner, Search for Tomorrow)

Best Actress in Daytime Drama - For a Special Program
Eve Arden (The ABC Afternoon Playbreak - episode "Mother of the Bride")

Best Individual Director for a Game Show
Jerome Shaw (The Hollywood Squares)

Best Individual Director for a Daytime Drama
Wes Kenny (Days of our Lives)
Norman Hall (The Doctors)

Best Writing for a Game Show
Jay Redack, Harry Friedman, Harold Schneider, Gary Johnson, Steve Levitch, Rick Kellard, Rowby Goren (The Hollywood Squares)

Best Writing for a Drama Series
Henry Slesar (The Edge of Night)
Frank Hursley, Doris Hursley, Bridget Dobson, and Deborah Hardy (General Hospital)
Eileen Pollock, Robert Mason Pollock, and James Lipton (The Doctors)

Best Host or Hostess in a Talk, Service, or Variety Series
Dinah Shore (Dinah's Place, NBC)

Best Host or Hostess in a Game Show
Peter Marshall (The Hollywood Squares)
Monty Hall (Let's Make a Deal)

Outstanding Game Show
 Password
 Let's Make a Deal
 Hollywood Squares

Outstanding Entertainment - Children's Series
 Zoom - Jim Crum, Christopher Sarson; PBS
Captain Kangaroo - James Kramer (executive producer), Jim Hirschfeld (producer); CBS
Fat Albert and the Cosby Kids - Norm Prescott, Lou Scheimer (producers); CBS
Star Trek: The Animated Series - Lou Scheimer, Norm Prescott (producers); NBC

References

001
D